The Local Authorities as Drivers for Development Education and Raising-Awareness Project or LADDER Project, was launched by the European Association for Local Democracy, in 2015 with the objective of develop and increase the action of Local Authorities in European Union policies of Development Education and Awareness Raising (DEAR). The associates of this project work with education and awareness raising as a tool to trigger and foster the process of a resilient, sustainable development through a peaceful and democratic way.

Since its beginning, this project has provided a space to discuss how to improve the promotion of Development Education at the local level, how Local Authorities and Civil Society Organizations are essential for DEAR and how to efficiently act local by thinking global. Its relevance is due to the diversity of partners and associates it involves, including local authorities, NGOs, networks of civil society organizations and experts in the field, from 35 countries, 18 from the European Union and 17 non-EU countries. LADDER is co-funded by the European Union, and has a duration of 36 months (January 2015 – December 2017). 
 The activities are organised along six thematic paths (Youth in development, Migration, Citizens’ participation in development, Public-private cooperation in development, Environmental and sustainable development, European Year for Development and follow up) and three geographical areas (Mediterranean area, South Eastern Europe, Eastern Partnership), which are combined according to the interests of the partners and associates.

Background
This project is a follow up of the Working Together for Development (WTD) project, which focused on information, training, networking for local authorities associations and civil society organisations in the field of development cooperation. The great majority of the partners of this former project are the ones that integrate the LADDER initiative, conducting a series of capacity building seminars & trainings, exchange meetings, conferences and events at all levels.

Partners and Associates
The LADDER Project has 25 partners and 18 associates.

References

External links
 Official website L.A.D.D.E.R. Project 
 L.A.D.D.E.R. Project Roadmap 2015-2017

Political organizations based in Europe